Rainer Spiering (born 27 January 1956) is a German politician. Born in Dissen, Lower Saxony, he represents the SPD. Rainer Spiering has served as a member of the Bundestag from the state of Lower Saxony from 2013 to October 2021.

Life 
He became member of the bundestag after the 2013 German federal election. He is a member of the Committee for Food and Agriculture.
In June 2020, Spiering announced that he would not stand in the 2021 federal elections

References

External links 

  
 Bundestag biography 

1956 births
Living people
Members of the Bundestag for Lower Saxony
Members of the Bundestag 2017–2021
Members of the Bundestag 2013–2017
Members of the Bundestag for the Social Democratic Party of Germany